WHHD (98.3 FM) is a Top 40 station serving the Augusta, Georgia metro area. It is owned by Beasley Broadcast Group, Inc., through licensee Beasley Media Group, LLC, and is licensed by the Federal Communications Commission (FCC) to Clearwater, South Carolina to broadcast with an effective radiated power (ERP) of 11.5 kW.  Its studios are located just two blocks from the Augusta-Richmond County border in unincorporated Columbia County, Georgia and the transmitter is in Martinez, Georgia. It is the only Top 40 formatted station in the Augusta market.

History
98.3 signed on as WCNA in April 1987 with an easy listening format. It became WSLT in 1993 with an adult contemporary format under the handle "Lite 98.3".

In February 2006, the station dropped the AC format and aired a loop of a brief snippet of Gorillaz's "Feel Good Inc." (the laughing heard in the beginning and end of the song) nonstop for 24 hours. When the stunt ended, "HD98.3" was born with a CHR format, filling the void left when the former WZNY flipped to country as WIBL a little more than a year previous.

Previous logo

See also

Media in Augusta, Georgia

External links
HD98.3 — official website

HHD
Contemporary hit radio stations in the United States
Radio stations established in 1987
Beasley Broadcast Group radio stations